Kylie Williams may refer to:

Kylie Williams (Miss Florida) (born 1983), American model and Miss Florida 2007 winner
Kylie Williams (geoscientist), Canadian geoscientist and recipient of the 2021 E. R. Ward Neale Medal

See also
 Kyle Williams (disambiguation)